Bansaid may refer to:
 Bansaid-e Olya
 Bansaid-e Sofla